Sir William Master (1600–1662) was an English politician.

Early life
William Master was born in 1600 in Gloucestershire, England, the son of George Master and Bridget Cornwall, daughter and heiress of John Cornwall, Esq. of Marlborough. He was the grandson of Richard Master.

In 1622, he was knighted by King James I, and in 1623, elected to represent Cirencester in Parliament. He served as High Sheriff of Gloucestershire in 1627 following his appointment to the position by King Charles I.

English Civil War
Initially Master was favourable to Parliament at the outbreak of the English Civil War, however, following the Royalist invasion of his town, Master signed over contributions to the Royal Army after Prince Rupert and Prince Maurice were quartered in his home, and he became a staunch Royalist. King Charles I would also spend time in Master's home, once in August 1642 en route from Oxford to Bristol and again in 1644 en route from Oxford to Bath.

His estate was eventually sequestered and by 1652 was still faced with difficulty as a result.

Marriage and family
Sir William married Alice, daughter of Sir Edward Estcourt, and had 12 children:
Thomas, esquire and heir
William, author of "Essays and Observations, Theological and Moral"
George, barrister
Richard
John, doctor
Robert
Mary, married Richard Browne, Esq.
Ann, married Richard Morgan, Esq.
Bridget, married Thomas Smythe, Esq.
Alice
Elizabeth
Winifred

References

1600 births
1662 deaths
English knights
English MPs 1624–1625
High Sheriffs of Gloucestershire
Cavaliers
Politicians from Gloucestershire